P26 or P-26 may refer to:

 Boeing P-26 Peashooter, an American fighter aircraft
 P26/40 tank, an Italian World War II tank
 Papyrus 26, a biblical manuscript
 Paratech P26, a Swiss paraglider
 Phosphorus-26, an isotope of phosphorus
 Projekt-26, a stay-behind army in Switzerland
 Pseudomonas sRNA P26